Shahbaz Ahmad (Urdu: شہباز احمد) (born September 1, 1968) is a former field hockey player from Pakistan who is also known by his nickname as "Shahbaz Ahmed Senior". He was born in to Arain family.

Career
He is considered to be among the best forwards in the history of field hockey. He joined the Pakistan National Hockey Team in 1986, and was captain of the national side, that led his team to the 1994 Men's Hockey World Cup victory. "He played a major role in Pakistan victories in 1994 World Cup in Sydney, Australia and Champions Trophy 1994 in Lahore, Pakistan." After the Atlanta Games in 1996, he played for Dutch club Oranje Zwart and for German club Harvestehuder THC from Hamburg for a couple of years.

Called  the Maradona of Hockey he has represented Pakistan in the Champions Trophy tournaments held in 1986, 1987, 1988, 1989; 3rd Asia Cup, New Delhi 1989; 7th Hockey World Cup, 1990 in Lahore, BMW Trophy Amsterdam, 1990, 11th Asian Games Beijing, 1990, 12th Champions Trophy, Melbourne and Hockey World Cup, Sydney, 1994. He made his world-famous run down against Australia in the same tournament. " But in 1994, at the Sydney World Cup, in the pool match between Australia and Pakistan, Australia had a similar free hit just outside the Pakistan circle which was intercepted and moved onto Pakistan's Shahbaz who then executed his famous run with Australia's Ken Wark chasing him. Shahbaz drew a covering defender and reverse-sticked the ball to Kamran Ashraf, who scored." "Twenty years have passed, but the memories of his breathtaking runs against Australia, Germany and the Netherlands are etched in memories of millions."

He played at three Olympic Games, winning a bronze medal in 1992.

Shahbaz Ahmad was declared the best player in the Seventh World Cup, Lahore, 1990,  and received the BMW Trophy, Amsterdam, 1990. He has won gold medals in the 3rd Asia Cup, New Delhi, 1989; Gold Medal Asian Games, Beijing, 1990; Gold Medal 1994 Champions Trophy Lahore, Gold Medal 1994 World Cup, Sydney,  silver medal  in Champions Trophy, 1988; 7th world cup, Lahore, 1990; BMW Trophy, Amsterdam, 1990; and a bronze medal in 8th Champions Trophy, 1986. He was awarded the best player award in 1994 world cup Sydney as well.
He played in 1998 and 2002 Men's hockey world cup not as a captain instead as a player.

Awards and recognition

Shahbaz Ahmad is regarded as one of the best forwards in the game for his agility, body dodge and  ball control. He is the only player in the history of Field Hockey to win two consecutive 'Player of the Tournament' awards in the 1990 World Cup in Lahore, and at the 1994 World Cup in Sydney. He leads the list of most-capped Pakistanis with 304 caps (a total of 304 games) in international field hockey.
 Hilal-i-Pakistan (Crescent of Pakistan) Award by the President of Pakistan.
 In recognition of his outstanding contribution in the field of hockey, he was awarded the President's Pride of Performance Award in 1992 by the Government of Pakistan.
 In 2002, Shahbaz Ahmed retired from playing the game of field hockey for good. In 2010, Shahbaz is performing his services as the district manager of Pakistan International Airlines (PIA) in Saudi Arabia.
 In 2015, he was appointed Secretary General of Pakistan Hockey Federation.

See also
Pakistan Hockey Federation

References

External links
 

1968 births
Living people
Pakistani male field hockey players
Male field hockey forwards
Olympic field hockey players of Pakistan
Field hockey players at the 1988 Summer Olympics
Field hockey players at the 1992 Summer Olympics
Field hockey players at the 1996 Summer Olympics
Olympic medalists in field hockey
1998 Men's Hockey World Cup players
2002 Men's Hockey World Cup players
Field hockey players from Faisalabad
Recipients of the Pride of Performance
St. Anthony's High School, Lahore alumni
Medalists at the 1992 Summer Olympics
Olympic bronze medalists for Pakistan
Field hockey players at the 1986 Asian Games
Field hockey players at the 1990 Asian Games
Field hockey players at the 1994 Asian Games
Asian Games medalists in field hockey
Asian Games gold medalists for Pakistan
Asian Games silver medalists for Pakistan
Asian Games bronze medalists for Pakistan
Medalists at the 1986 Asian Games
Medalists at the 1990 Asian Games
Medalists at the 1994 Asian Games
Harvestehuder THC players
Oranje Zwart players
1990 Men's Hockey World Cup players